Scutalus macedoi is a species of  tropical air-breathing land snail, a pulmonate gastropod mollusk in the family Bulimulidae.

Distribution 

 Peru

This species was described from Capillacocha, 11°10’09’S 076°02’25’W, 4150 m, Junín Region, Peru.

Breure (2010) recorded it for the first time from the western slopes of the Cordillera Occidental near Laguna El Viuda, 11°21’45’S 076°38’23’W, 4450 m, Canta Province, Lima Region, Peru.

The material from Canta province has the upper whorls reddish-blue and the specimens are more slender than those shown in the original figure of Weyrauch. However, compared to paratypes (RMNH 55449/5), the shell shape is similar.

References
This article incorporates CC-BY-3.0 text from the reference 

Bulimulidae
Gastropods described in 1967